Nirmala (Hindi निर्मला, immaculate, virtuous) is a 1938 Indian Hindi-language social drama film directed by Franz Osten and produced by Bombay Talkies.

Cast

Devika Rani as Nirmala 
Ashok Kumar as Ramdas 
Maya Devi as Vimla
Kamta Prasad as Professor
Mumtaz Ali
P.F.Pithawala as Rajanikant, Nirmala's Father
M. Nazir as Loknath
Saroj Borkar as Maya Devi, Nirmala's mother
Yusuf Sulehman as Brajnath
P.R.Joshi as Gehni
Haridas
Y.G.Takle as The Inspector
S.Gulab as Loknath's mother 
Bhim as Young Loknath
Vipin Mehta 
Nzeer Bedi
Pratima as Ramdas's Mother
Meera as Beggar Girl
Gulbadan as Young Nirmala
Balwant Singh
Swarupa  
Ehsan as Young Ramdas/Ramu
Tarabai Solanki
Dance Director
Mumtaz Ali

External links 

 Nirmala on indiancine.ma
 

Articles containing video clips
Indian drama films
1938 drama films
1938 films
Hindi-language drama films